The 1949-51 Israel State Cup (Gvia HaMedina) was to be the sixteenth season of Israeli Football Association's nationwide football cup competition, the first after independence of Israel. However, the competition was never completed.

Tournament details

As the 1948 Arab-Israeli War was fought, starting from the declaration of independence of Israel in May 1948, most civilian operations, including those of the Israeli Football Association were suspended, and only in early 1949, as the military activities dwindled, the IFA resumed operation.

As Israel entered the 1950 FIFA World Cup qualification and matches against Yugoslavia were set to August and September 1949, the IFA were keen to resume league and cup operations. Cup matches were set to start in early April 1949, with the final set to 21 May 1949, with league matches starting a week later. For this edition of the cup teams were set to play two legs, home and away, for each round, except for the final.

Matches started on 9 April 1949, but were brought to a halt on 28 May 1949, after the apparent completion of the quarter-final matches. As Maccabi Tel Aviv and Maccabi Avshalom Petah Tikva appealed their elimination in the quarter-finals, and as 1949-50 Israeli League matches began 28 May 1949, the cup matches didn't resume before the end of the 1948-49 football season.

As decision in the appeal of Maccabi Petah Tikva wasn't given until early 1951, and as disagreements between Hapoel and Maccabi brought the IFA to a stalemate, cup matches didn't resume until 3 February 1951. Three further matches were played during February 1951, but no more matches were played and the tournament was abandoned at the end of the 1950-51 football season.

Results

First round

|}

Deciding match

Quarter-finals

|}

Semi-finals

|}

Notes

References 
 100 Years of Football 1906-2006, Elisha Shohat (Israel), 2006

External links 
 Israel Football Association website 

Israel State Cup
Israel State Cup
Israel State Cup
State Cup
State Cup
State Cup
Israel State Cup seasons